South Carolina Highway 268 (SC 268) is a  state highway in the U.S. state of South Carolina. The highway connects rural areas of Chesterfield County with Mount Croghan.

Route description
SC 268 begins at an intersection with SC 265 at a point southwest of Ruby, within a rural part of Chesterfield County. It travels to the northeast and crosses Little Black Creek. It continues in a fairly northeastern direction and crosses Deep Creek just before entering the city limits of Mount Croghan. In the center of town, it meets its northern terminus, an intersection with SC 9 and SC 109 (Main Street/Camden Road).

Major intersections

See also

References

External links

SC 268 at Virginia Highways' South Carolina Highways Annex

268
Transportation in Chesterfield County, South Carolina